"All Night" is a song recorded by American country music duo Brothers Osborne. It is the lead single to their third studio album Skeletons. The duo's members, T.J. Osborne and John Osborne, wrote the song with Andrew DeRoberts.

Content
The duo's two members, T.J. Osborne and John Osborne, wrote the song with Andrew DeRoberts, and Jay Joyce produced the track. Describing the song to The Country Daily, John said, "We wanted to write a song that just felt good. We didn’t want to think too hard about it. We wanted to write a song that no matter what happened we knew that our fans at our shows were gonna love to sing along to, and that’s what we did”. The duo also performed the song at the 2020 Country Music Association telecast.

Music video
The song's music video, released on September 30, 2020, was directed by Wes Edwards and Ryan Silver, both of whom have directed most of the brothers' other music videos. In it, a man is depicted sitting at home when he receives a package that features life-sized dancing puppets. This is alternated with scenes of the duo performing the song while under a blacklight, as the puppets appear around them with neon skeletons painted on.

Charts

Weekly charts

Year-end charts

Certifications

References

2020 singles
2020 songs
Brothers Osborne songs
Song recordings produced by Jay Joyce
Music videos directed by Wes Edwards
EMI Records singles